Universities with BDSM clubs are a modern phenomenon, especially in the USA. Some of these student clubs dedicated to BDSM (along with sexual fetishism and kink) are officially recognized and funded by their university or college administration. The extent of nudity and consensual pain allowed in each BDSM club varies, as per the university.   

The following is a list of universities that have registered student clubs for BDSM  (along with sexual fetishism and kink education):

 USA
Arizona State University
Brown University
California State University, Northridge
Columbia University's BDSM club Conversio Virium
Cornell University
Harvard University
Harvey Mudd College
Iowa State University's BDSM club Cuffs.
Kent State University
MIT (Massachusetts Institute of Technology)
Mount Holyoke College
Molloy College 
Northwestern University
Ohio State University
Princeton University
Reed College
San Francisco State University
Stanford University
Stony Brook University
Syracuse University
Texas State University
Tufts University
UC Berkeley
University of California, Santa Barbara
University of Chicago
University of Connecticut
University of Michigan
University of Minnesota
University of Notre Dame
University of Pennsylvania
University of Southern California
University of Wisconsin–Madison
University of Washington
Washington State University
Washington University in St. Louis
Yale University

In terms of the number of universities having BDSM clubs, USA is the world leader. Additionally, there are many American universities that do not have a dedicated BDSM club but regularly conduct workshops on safe BDSM for students, for example the University of South Florida St. Petersburg and Hofstra University.

Some American universities, such as Texas Tech University, Indiana University and Michigan State University, have professors who conduct research and take curriculum classes on BDSM.

A few U.S. university presses, such as those of Duke University, Indiana University and University of Chicago, have also published books on BDSM written by professors.

 Canada
 McGill University
 University of Calgary
 York University

 United Kingdom
 Dundee University
Durham University
 Imperial College London
 Lancaster University
 University of Lincoln
 University of Nottingham
 University of Portsmouth
 University of York
 Warwick University

 Belgium
Ghent University

 Finland
University of Helsinki

Taiwan
National Cheng Kung University
National Taiwan Normal University
National Taiwan University
National Tsing Hua University

See also
 BDSM in culture and media
 BDSM and the law
 Primal Scream (Harvard)
 Sex club
 Sex education
 Sex Week at Yale

References 

BDSM
Universities with bdsm clubs
Universities with bdsm clubs